Sedlarjevo is a settlement on the right bank of the Sotla River in the Municipality of Podčetrtek in eastern Slovenia, right on the border with Croatia. The area around Podčetrtek was traditionally part of the region of Styria. It is now included in the Savinja Statistical Region.

References

External links
Sedlarjevo on Geopedia

Populated places in the Municipality of Podčetrtek